Susana López Navia (17 September 1910 – 19 May 1964) was the wife of the 21st President of Colombia, Guillermo León Valencia Muñoz, and served as First Lady of Colombia from 1962 to 1964.

Personal life
Susana López Navia was born on 17 September 1910 in Palmira, Valle del Cauca to Gustavo López Terreros and Lucrecia Navia Carvajal. She married Guillermo León Valencia Muñoz on 31 January 1931. They had four children together: Pedro Felipe, Alma, Ignacio, and Diana.

In 1958, López, who had been diagnosed with hypertension, suffered a stroke that left her with hemiplegia and using a wheelchair. 

López died on 19 May 1964 at the Palacio de Nariño in Bogotá of a pulmonary embolism brought on by her condition. She was the first spouse of a Colombian president to die while her husband was still in office.

References

1910 births
1964 deaths
People from Valle del Cauca Department
Valencia family
First ladies of Colombia